The Beijing–Kunming high-speed train are high-speed train services between Beijing and Kunming, the capital of Yunnan Province. Two pairs of trains are operated daily by CR Beijing and CR Kunming, with train numbers designated as G71/G72, G401/402. 

History
The high-speed trains between Beijing and Kunming began operations on 1 January 2017, with the completion of the Shanghai–Kunming HSR. The two pairs of trains were both extensions from other services. With the opening of high-speed train services, the travelling time by train between Beijing and Kunming was shortened from over 33 hours to 12 hours.

Operations
The G403/404 trains only have six intermediate stops and are the fastest train services on this route, with a travelling time of 10 hours 43 minutes. The trains are also called as the "benchmark trains".

●: stop at the station
↓ or ↑: pass the station
  : Benchmark train

Train formation
The G71/402 trains are operated by 8-car CR400AF trainsets staffed by CR Beijing, the capacity being 576 (1152 if double-headed). 

The G403/406 trains are operated by 8-car CRH380A trainsets staffed by CR Kunming, the capacity being 556 (1112 if double-headed).  

The G405/404 trains are operated by 16-car CRH380AL trainsets staffed by CR Beijing, the capacity being 1028.

References

China Railway passenger services
Passenger rail transport in China
Railway services introduced in 2017